William Dias Massari (born 25 July 1990), sometimes known as Massari, is a Brazilian professional footballer who plays as a defender.

Career
Massari was born in Santa Catarina, Brazil. He began playing football with Figueirense FC, winning the Copa São Paulo de Futebol Júnior with the club's youth side.

Honours
Cafetaleros de Tapachula
 Ascenso MX: Clausura 2018

References

External links 
 

1990 births
Living people
Brazilian footballers
Association football defenders
Figueirense FC players
Sport Club Internacional players
Criciúma Esporte Clube players
Paraná Clube players
Grêmio Esportivo Juventus players
Sport Club São Paulo players
Volta Redonda FC players
Veranópolis Esporte Clube Recreativo e Cultural players
Sud América players
Cafetaleros de Chiapas footballers
FC Juárez footballers
Ascenso MX players
Brazilian expatriate footballers
Brazilian expatriate sportspeople in Portugal
Brazilian expatriate sportspeople in Mexico
Brazilian expatriate sportspeople in Uruguay
Expatriate footballers in Portugal
Expatriate footballers in Mexico
Expatriate footballers in Uruguay